The Racovița is a right tributary of the river Ialomița in Romania. It flows into the Ialomița in Băleni-Români.

References

Rivers of Romania
Rivers of Dâmbovița County